Predigtstuhl is German for "pulpit", but may also refer to:

Mountains or hills 
 Predigtstuhl (Schladming Tauern), 2543 m, in the Schladminger Tauern, Styria
 , also Predigtstein, 2234 m, in the Gaistal, Wettersteingebirge, Tyrol
 Predigtstuhl (Kaiser), 2116 m, in the Wilder Kaiser, Tyrol
 Predigtstuhl (Karwendel), 1920 m, in the Karwendel east of Mittenwald, Bavaria
 A subpeak, 1903 m, of the Rax, in Upper Styria on the border with Lower Austria
 Predigtstuhl (Latten Mountains), 1613 m, in the Latten Mountains, Berchtesgaden Alps, south of Bad Reichenhall, Bavaria
 Predigtstuhl, 1562 m, a mountain in Bavaria, see Blauberge
 Predigtstuhl (Chiemgau Alps), 1494 m, in the Chiemgau Alps
 Predigtstuhl (Lower Bavaria), 1024 m, in the Bavarian Forest, Bavaria
 Predigtstuhl (Nöchling), 520 m, near Nöchling in the Strudengau, Upper  and Lower Austria
 Gallitzinberg, Wilhelminenberg, 449 m, hill in Vienna-Ottakring
 Predigtstuhl (Dunkelstein Forest), ~440 m, near Göttweig in the Dunkelstein Forest, Lower Austria
 Predigtstuhl (Wieningerberg), 718 m, the highest mountain of the Thaya-Highland near Dietmanns, Lower Austria

See also 
 Preikestolen, Norwegian for Predigtstuhl, hill in Norway
 Predigtstuhl Cable Car